9 and 9A Southgate Street is a 17th-century Jacobean timber-framed merchant's house on Southgate Street, Gloucester. It has been a Grade I listed building since 23 January 1952.  9 Southgate Street is now occupied by Costa Coffee and 9A Southgate Street is occupied by The Tiger's Eye restaurant.

History
The actual Bell Inn building itself was actually built for the Mayor of Gloucester at the time, Thomas Yate, in 1664–5 as a merchant's house. Sash windows were added to all of the upper floors in the eighteenth century.

Thomas and Elizabeth (Edwards) Whitefield (newlyweds from Bristol, England), during their honeymoon in Gloucester, purchased both the apothecary and the next door home of Mayor Yates. They converted it into the luxurious Bell Inn (Hotel), complete with full service stables and stores on the bottom floor. The old apothecary building was converted into a tavern with a theater and a ballroom for large social events. Actors were hired by the Whitefield family to perform at Bell Inn Pub Building, once referred to as the Apothecary.

On 27 December 1714, the Reverend George Whitefield was born at the Bell Inn, the seventh and last child born to the Whitefields. In 1782, John Phillpott became the landlord of the Bell Inn.

This was the headquarters of the Tory True Blue Club when it was founded in 1789. In the nineteenth century 9/9A was also known as the Old Blue shop where blue dye was manufactured by James Lee.

Around this time the left rear wing was rebuilt in brick and sash windows were added to it. Throughout the nineteenth and twentieth century the upper floors were remodeled and in the twentieth century, the shop front was updated. In 1912, 9/9A became part of the Bell Inn.

In 1967, the Bell Inn was closed. It was demolished in the 1970s to make room for Eastgate Shopping Centre. It was restored in 1992 by Gloucester City Council.

In 2014, Gloucester City Council added LED lights to the front of the building to draw attention to the timber facade at night time.

Architecture
The building has three stories as well as an attic and cellar. It has a timber facade, which may have been built from the wood of the Mayflower, and is built of brick with a timber frame. There is a brick rear wing to the left. The ground floor serves as the shop front and each upper floor has three large sash windows. There are two hip-roofed dormers which form part of the attic. Inside there is a nineteenth-century staircase up to the first floor. The front room of the first floor has decorative plasterwork and a mid-nineteenth century fireplace within a magnificently carved surround with cherubs, such as cornucopia and a segmental pediment with broken overmantel with the Yate/Berkeley coat of arms above it which dates to 1650. There are seventeenth century dog-leg stairs which rise from the first to the top floor. The rooms of the second floor and attic are paneled in oak.

Myths
There have been reports that the building is haunted by a spirit called Elsie who likes to move cutlery around.

References

Grade I listed buildings in Gloucestershire
Buildings and structures completed in 1665
Buildings and structures in Gloucester
Defunct hotels in England